Indian Lake is a common name of many waterbodies within the U.S. state of Michigan.  According to the Geographic Names Information System (GNIS), there are at least 38 bodies of water in the state that use the Indian Lake name.  These bodies of water may include lakes, reservoirs, streams, swamps, or canals with the Indian Lake name or variations.

All information pertaining to the county, coordinates, and elevation are retrieved from the corresponding GNIS identification website.  Lakes that provide no area measurements are likely very small and have no published information listing their size.

See also
 Indian Lake, an unincorporated community along Indian Lake in Cass County.
 Indian Lake State Park (Michigan)
 Indian River (Michigan)

Notes

References

Indian Lake
Indian